GMML may refer to:

 Hassan I Airport (ICAO:GMML) in Laâyoune, Western Sahara (administered by Morocco)
 Greater Manchester Metro Limited, a light rail consortium in Manchester, UK